Microtragus is a genus of longhorn beetles of the subfamily Lamiinae, containing the following species:

 Microtragus arachne Pascoe, 1865
 Microtragus basalis Lea, 1917
 Microtragus bifasciatus Lea, 1917
 Microtragus browni Carter, 1932
 Microtragus cristulatus Aurivillius, 1917
 Microtragus discospinosus Carter, 1932
 Microtragus echinatus Carter, 1926
 Microtragus gazellae Kriesche, 1923
 Microtragus luctuosus (Shuckard, 1838)
 Microtragus mormon Pascoe, 1865
 Microtragus multituberculatus Breuning, 1954
 Microtragus quadrimaculatus Blackburn, 1892
 Microtragus senex White, 1846
 Microtragus tuberculatus Carter, 1934
 Microtragus unicristatus Breuning, 1942
 Microtragus waterhousei Pascoe, 1864

References

Parmenini